Okić   is a village in Croatia. It is connected by the D6 highway.

References

Populated places in Karlovac County